Stare Worowo  (formerly German Alt Wuhrow) is a village in the administrative district of Gmina Złocieniec, within Drawsko County, West Pomeranian Voivodeship, in north-western Poland.

For the history of the region, see History of Pomerania.

References

Stare Worowo